Carlos Rafael Jorge (born 24 September 1986) is an athlete from the Dominican Republic, competing in sprinting events and the long jump.

His personal best jump is 7.96 metres, achieved in July 2006 in Santo Domingo. This is the current Dominican Republic record.  His 200 m best is 20.63 seconds, set in Mayagüez in 2012.

Competition record

References

1986 births
Living people
Dominican Republic male sprinters
Dominican Republic long jumpers
Male long jumpers
Athletes (track and field) at the 2012 Summer Olympics
Olympic athletes of the Dominican Republic
Athletes (track and field) at the 2007 Pan American Games
Athletes (track and field) at the 2011 Pan American Games
Pan American Games competitors for the Dominican Republic